Yasica Arriba is a town in the province of Puerto Plata in the Dominican Republic.

Climate

References

Sources 
 http://nona.net/features/map/placedetail.1530656/Los%20Bellosos/
  – World-Gazetteer.com

Populated places in Puerto Plata Province